Jean Condom (born 15 August 1960 in Saint-André-de-Seignanx) is a retired French international rugby union player. He played as a lock.

He played for Boucau, from 1980/81 to 1985/86, for Biarritz Olympique, from 1986/87 to 1995/96. His final team was Aviron Bayonnais in 1996/97.

He had 61 caps for France, from 1982 to 1990, without ever scoring. He earned his first cap on 31 October 1982 against Romania at Bucharest in 13–9 loss. He was called for the 1987 Rugby World Cup, playing in five games, including the final where France was runners-up to New Zealand.

He played in eight editions of the Five Nations Championship, from 1983 to 1990, being a winner in 1983, 1986, 1987, 1988 and 1989.

He had his last cap at the 29-18 win over Australia, on 30 June 1990, in a tour.

References

External links

1960 births
French rugby union players
Living people
France international rugby union players
Biarritz Olympique players
Rugby union locks
Sportspeople from Landes (department)
Aviron Bayonnais players